Club Korfbal Vacarisses is a Catalan korfball team located in Vacarisses (Catalonia). The team was founded on 2003 and they play in white shirts and red shorts/skirts. They are the current Catalan national champions.

Honours

2004 - 2005 - Catalonia national champions - Catalonia cup champions
2005 - 2006 - Catalonia national champions - Catalonia cup champions
2006 - 2007 - Catalonia national champions 
2007 - 2008 - Catalonia national champions - Catalonia cup champions
2008 - 2009 - Catalonia national champions - Catalonia cup champions
2009 - 2010 - Catalonia national champions

Team

 Head coach  Antonio Vargas Guijarro

External links
 Info about CK Vacarisses in the FCK website

Vacarisses
Korfball teams